The World Rugby Sevens Player of the Year is awarded by World Rugby each year. It was first awarded in 2004. The award is based in large part on the player’s performance over the course of the World Rugby Sevens Series, along with other Sevens tournaments during the year.

From 2004 until 2008 the award was called the IRB International Sevens Player of the Year. From 2009 until 2013, it was the IRB Sevens Player of the Year. Since 2014, following the International Rugby Board becoming World Rugby, the award has been titled the World Rugby Sevens Player of the Year.

List of winners

Winners with multiple nominations

Explanatory notes
This section provides additional detail to the table above regarding the team and player accomplishments that season that helped the player win the Sevens Player of the Year award.

 2010: Samoa won its first ever World Series title
 2013: Tim Mikkelson was recognized as the Player of the Tournament at the 2013 Rugby World Cup Sevens.
 2014: Samisoni Viriviri led all players in tries scored with 52.
 2015: Werner Kok led all players in tackles made.
 2016: Seabelo Senatla led all players in tries scored with 66.
 2017: Perry Baker led the World Series in several statistical categories — 57 tries, 76 clean breaks, and 285 points.
 2018: Baker was the World Series leader in tries with 37 before missing the last three rounds to injury, returning to help the USA to its best-ever finish of sixth at the 2018 Rugby World Cup Sevens.
2019: Tuwai was fifth in clean breaks with 34.
2021: Marcos Moneta lead Argentina to their first Rugby Bronze Olympic Medal and he ended being the tryman at that tournament. At the olympics he scored two tries in the memorable match between Argentina and South Africa where Gaston Revol was expelled and Argentina where playing with 6 players.
2022: Terry Kenneddy led Ireland to a bronze medal at the Rugby World Cup Sevens.

Other World Rugby Awards
 
 World Rugby Men's 15s Player of the Year
 World Rugby Team of the Year 
 World Rugby Coach of the Year 
 World Rugby Junior Player of the Year
 World Rugby Women’s 15s Player of the Year
 World Rugby Women's Sevens Player of the Year
 IRB Spirit of Rugby Award 
 Vernon Pugh Award for Distinguished Service 
 World Rugby Referee Award
 IRB Development Award 
 IRB Chairman's Award

See also
 World Rugby Sevens Series#Player awards by season

References

External links
World Rugby Awards

Players